Sean Fraser (born September 21, 1980) is a former professional soccer player who played the majority of his career in the United Soccer Leagues.

Career
Before beginning his pro career Fraser was a standout striker for the University of Memphis where he led Conference USA in goals (18) and points (42) in earning All-Conference honours in 2001. He began his professional career in the USL A-League with Calgary Storm in 2003. His signing was announced on April 21, 2003 in a press report. Where he recorded 1 goal in 28 matches, but unfortunately Calgary failed to reach the postseason by finishing fourth in their division.

The following season he signed with his hometown club the Edmonton Aviators, a expansion franchise for the 2004 season. He made his debut for the club on May 1, 2004 in a 0-0 draw against the Vancouver Whitecaps (1986–2010).  With Edmonton, Fraser recorded four goals and two assists for a team which struggled on the field by finishing last in the standings and financial which forced the team to fold after only one season; releasing all their players from their contracts.

On May 10, 2005 it was announced that Fraser signed a contract with the Toronto Lynx. He made his debut for the club on April 23, 2005 in a match against the Portland Timbers (2001–10), which resulted in a 3-0 defeat. He recorded his first goal for the club on May 31, 2005 in a match against the Rochester Rhinos in a 5-3 defeat.  He concluded the season with Toronto with 3 goals and 3 assists. The team finished with a league worst 3 wins, 17 losses, and 8 ties and was the worst performance in league history and finished last in the standings.

In 2006, he and Lynx team mate Rumbani Munthali both signed for Nanchang Bayi in the Jia League to a two-year contract. In December, 2008 he signed a contract with the Edmonton Drillers  in the Canadian Major Indoor Soccer League.

International career
Fraser represented Canada at the 1998 CONCACAF U-19 Qualification Tournament (Canada did not qualify for the 1999 FIFA World Youth Championship) and helped Canada reach the quarter-final stage of the IV Jeux de la Francophonie Canada 2001 in Ottawa/Hull. He scored his first goal for Canada against France in the quarter-final game.

Honours
Fraser was recently inducted into the University of Memphis Hall of Fame in September 2009.

Sources

1980 births
Living people
Association football midfielders
Black Canadian soccer players
Calgary Mustangs (USL) players
Canadian expatriate sportspeople in the United States
Canadian expatriate soccer players
Canadian expatriates in China
Canadian soccer players
Edmonton Drillers (2007) players
Expatriate footballers in China
Memphis Tigers men's soccer players
Shanghai Shenxin F.C. players
China League One players
Soccer players from Edmonton
Toronto Lynx players
USL First Division players
Canada men's youth international soccer players
Canada men's under-23 international soccer players
Edmonton Aviators / F.C. players